S/2022 J 3 is a small outer natural satellite of Jupiter discovered by Scott S. Sheppard on 30 August 2022, using the 4.0-meter Víctor M. Blanco Telescope at Cerro Tololo Observatory, Chile. It was announced by the Minor Planet Center on 22 February 2023, after observations were collected over a long enough time span to confirm the satellite's orbit.

References 

Ananke group
Moons of Jupiter
Irregular satellites
20220830
Discoveries by Scott S. Sheppard
Moons with a retrograde orbit